Thomas Michael Bruno (born January 26, 1953) is a former Major League Baseball pitcher. He batted right-handed and threw right-handed. He was born in Chicago, Illinois. He played parts of four seasons in the majors from  until  for the Kansas City Royals, Toronto Blue Jays, and St. Louis Cardinals. Primarily a relief pitcher, Bruno won 7 games in his major league career. His best season came in 1978. Bruno compiled a 4–3 record, a 1.107 WHIP, and an impressive 1.99 ERA. On August 11, 1978, Bruno picked up the only save of his major league career. He pitched a flawless 12th inning, striking out the side, to nail down a 4-1 Cardinals victory over the Mets. 

Bruno is currently a United States Coast Guard Master Captain and the owner of Major League Adventures, LLC, a hunting and fishing guide service and outfitter based in Pierre, South Dakota.

References

External links

Major League Baseball pitchers
Kansas City Royals players
St. Louis Cardinals players
Waterloo Royals players
Springfield Redbirds players
San Jose Bees players
Omaha Royals players
Jacksonville Suns players
Toledo Mud Hens players
People from Pierre, South Dakota
1953 births
Living people
Baseball players from Chicago